Auguste-Joseph Franchomme (10 April 180821 January 1884) was a French cellist and composer. For his contributions to music, he was decorated with the Légion d'honneur in 1884.

Life and career
Born in Lille, Franchomme studied at the local conservatoire with M. Mas and Pierre Baumann, before continuing his education with Jean-Henri Levasseur and Louis-Pierre Norblin at the Conservatoire de Paris, where he won his first prize only after one year.

He began his career playing with various orchestras and was appointed solo cello at the Sainte-Chapelle in 1828.  Along with the violinist Jean-Delphin Alard, teacher of Pablo de Sarasate, and the pianist Charles Hallé, creator of the Hallé Orchestra, he was a founder and member of the Alard Quartet.  The Quartet was rare for a chamber ensemble of its time because it consisted of professional musicians.  Franchomme also belonged to the founding ranks of the Société des Concerts du Conservatoire.

Franchomme forged close friendships with Felix Mendelssohn, when the latter visited Paris in 1831, and with Frédéric Chopin.  In 1833, Chopin and Franchomme collaborated to write a Grand Duo concertant for piano and cello, based on themes from Giacomo Meyerbeer's opera Robert le diable.  Franchomme also rewrote the cello parts for Chopin's Polonaise Brillante, Op. 3, and was the dedicatee of Chopin's Cello Sonata, Op. 65. Franchomme was also the dedicatee of the cello sonata of Charles-Valentin Alkan.

With the exception of a trip to England in 1856, Franchomme hardly left Paris, where he became a central figure of the city's musical life.  In 1843, he acquired the Duport Stradivarius from the son of Jean-Louis Duport for the then-record sum of 22,000 French francs.  He also owned the De Munck Stradivarius of 1730. Franchomme succeeded Norblin as the head professor of cello at the Paris Conservatory in 1846, and his class included Jules Delsart (who succeeded his master), Louis Hegyesi, and Ernest Gillet.

He died in his sleep of heart attack on 21 January 1884 at the age of 75, four days after he received the Légion d'honneur.

Legacy
Franchomme was the most celebrated cellist of his time and contributed to the refinement of the bowing technique—elegant, sweet, and light—which distinguished the French school developed by Jean-Pierre and Jean-Louis Duport. His left hand was renowned for its deft, precise, and expressive powers of execution. On 3 May 1856, the Weekly Chronicle and Register noted that he "carefully abstains from all abuse of the tremolo and of the exaggerated expression which are the distinguishing features in most modern violoncello playing".

As a composer, Franchomme published some fifty-five works for cello, including the Twelve Caprices, Op. 7, and the Twelve Études, with optional second cello, Op. 35; one cello concerto, Op. 33; as well as numerous other pieces with piano, orchestral, or chamber accompaniment.

Recordings
The Complete Caprices and Études (Clay Ruede, cello) Koch International 3-7226 (1994)

References

External links 
400 lettres de musiciens au Musée royal de Mariemont
Biography from Lev Ginsburg's History of the Violoncello (Paganiniana Publications, 1983) 

Research project on Franchomme by cellist Louise Dubin
Blog Days of Auguste Franchomme blog

1808 births
1884 deaths
Musicians from Lille
French classical cellists
French male classical composers
Chevaliers of the Légion d'honneur
French Romantic composers
19th-century classical composers
19th-century French composers
Conservatoire de Paris alumni
Academic staff of the Conservatoire de Paris
Burials at Montparnasse Cemetery
19th-century French male musicians
20th-century cellists